INS Sindhukesari (S60) (Saffron Coloured Sea) is a  diesel-electric submarine of the Indian Navy.

References

Sindhughosh-class submarines
Attack submarines
Ships built in the Soviet Union
1988 ships
Submarines of India